Bases may refer to:

Bases (fashion), a military style of dress adopted by the chivalry of the sixteenth century
Business Association of Stanford Entrepreneurial Students (BASES)
the plural form of base (disambiguation)
the plural form of basis (disambiguation)

See also
Base (disambiguation)